The 2003 Women's British Open was held 31 July to 3 August at Royal Lytham & St Annes Golf Club in Lancashire, England. It was the 27th edition of the Women's British Open, and the third as a major championship on the LPGA Tour. TNT Sports and ABC Sports televised the event in the United States and BBC Sport in the United Kingdom.

Annika Sörenstam won the sixth of her ten major titles, one stroke ahead of runner-up Se-Ri Pak, the 2001 champion. The victory completed the career grand slam for Sörenstam.

Course layout

Source:

Field

Past champions in the field

Round summaries

First round
Thursday, 31 July 2003

Second round
Friday, 1 August 2003

Amateurs: Serramià (+3), Keighley (+5), Brewerton (+6)

Third round
Saturday, 2 August 2003

Final round
Sunday, 3 August 2003

Amateur: Serramià (+6)

References

External links
Ladies European Tour: 2003 Weetabix Women's British Open results
LPGA: 2003 Women's British Open results

Women's British Open
Golf tournaments in England
British Open
Women's British Open
July 2003 sports events in the United Kingdom
August 2003 sports events in the United Kingdom
2000s in Lancashire